FTV-2203, also known as Samos 5, was an American reconnaissance satellite launched in 1961 as part of the Samos programme. It was a film return reconnaissance spacecraft, meaning that it returned images in a film capsule at the end of its mission.

The launch 

The launch of FTV-2203 occurred at 19:12:33 UTC on 22 December 1961. An Atlas LV-3A Agena-B rocket was used, flying from Launch Complex 1-2 at the Point Arguello Naval Air Station. During the launch, the first stage sustainer engine failed to shut down on time, and instead burned until all of its oxidiser had been depleted. As a result, the spacecraft reached a higher orbit than had been planned. It was assigned the Harvard designation 1961 Alpha Lambda 1.

Within a few days of launch, it was commanded to deorbit in order to return its film capsule. This was conducted, however due to the additional altitude provided by the anomaly during launch, it was unable to fully deorbit. The burn lowered its orbit, and it reentered the atmosphere on 31 December 1961. The film capsule, which had separated following the attempted deorbit burn, decayed on 9 January 1962.

References

Spacecraft launched in 1961
Satellite launch failures